This is a list of the National Register of Historic Places listings in Franklin County, Kentucky.

This is intended to be a complete list of the properties and districts on the National Register of Historic Places in Franklin County, Kentucky, United States.  The locations of National Register properties and districts for which the latitude and longitude coordinates are included below, may be seen in a map.

There are 56 properties and districts listed on the National Register in the county, of which 3 are National Historic Landmarks.

Current listings

|}

See also

 List of National Historic Landmarks in Kentucky
 National Register of Historic Places listings in Kentucky

References

Franklin